Ross Scheuerman (born March 5, 1993) is a former professional Canadian football running back. He played college football at Lafayette. Scheuerman was signed by the Pittsburgh Steelers as an undrafted free agent in 2015. He has also been a member of the Green Bay Packers and Philadelphia Eagles. He last played for the Hamilton Tiger-Cats of the Canadian Football League (CFL).

Scheuerman grew up in the Cream Ridge section of Upper Freehold Township, New Jersey and attended Allentown High School, where he set the conference career records for carries, rushing yards and touchdowns.

Professional career

Pittsburgh Steelers
After going undrafted in the 2015 NFL Draft, Scheuerman signed with the Pittsburgh Steelers on May 2, 2015. On August 2, 2015, he was waived by the Steelers.

Green Bay Packers
On December 8, 2015, Scheuerman was signed to the Green Bay Packers' practice squad. He was not re-signed after the season.

Philadelphia Eagles
Scheuerman was signed by the Philadelphia Eagles on January 21, 2016. On May 3, 2016, he was released by the Eagles.

Hamilton Tiger-Cats
On May 28, 2016, Scheuerman was signed by the Hamilton Tiger-Cats. He made his first start on September 16, 2016, after starting running back C. J. Gable went down with an injury. Scheuerman rushed for 79 yards on 19 carries; he also added 5 receptions for 40 yards.

References

External links
 
 Ross Scheuerman at the Canadian Football League
 Ross Scheuerman at the Hamilton Tiger-Cats
 Ross Scheuerman at the Lafayette Leopards

1993 births
Living people
Players of American football from New Jersey
American football running backs
Lafayette Leopards football players
Pittsburgh Steelers players
Philadelphia Eagles players
Hamilton Tiger-Cats players
Green Bay Packers players
People from Upper Freehold Township, New Jersey
Sportspeople from Monmouth County, New Jersey